The 174th Street station is a local station on the IRT White Plains Road Line of the New York City Subway. Located at the intersection of 174th Street, Southern Boulevard & Boston Road in the Crotona Park East neighborhood of the Bronx, it is served by the  train at all times, and the  train at all times except late nights and rush hours in the peak direction.

History

Early history 
The initial segment of the IRT White Plains Road Line opened on November 26, 1904, between 180th Street–Bronx Park and Jackson Avenue. Initially, trains on the line were served by elevated trains from the IRT Second Avenue Line and the IRT Third Avenue Line. Once the connection to the IRT Lenox Avenue Line opened on July 10, 1905, trains from the newly opened IRT subway ran via the line.

To address overcrowding, in 1909, the New York Public Service Commission proposed lengthening platforms at stations along the original IRT subway. As part of a modification to the IRT's construction contracts, made on January 18, 1910, the company was to lengthen station platforms to accommodate ten-car express and six-car local trains. In addition to $1.5 million (equivalent to $ million in ) spent on platform lengthening, $500,000 was spent on building additional entrances and exits. It was anticipated that these improvements would increase capacity by 25 percent. On January 23, 1911, ten-car express trains began running on the White Plains Road Line.

Later years 
The New York State Transit Commission announced plans to extend the southbound platforms at seven stations on the line from Jackson Avenue to 177th Street to accommodate ten-car trains for $81,900 on August 8, 1934.

The city government took over the IRT's operations on June 12, 1940. The Bergen Avenue cutoff, which allowed Third Avenue trains to access the White Plains Road Line, was abandoned on November 5, 1946, as part of the gradual curtailment of elevated service on the IRT Third Avenue Line. On June 13, 1949, the platform extensions at this station, as well as those on other White Plains Road Line stations between Jackson Avenue and 177th Street, opened. Previously, the stations could only accommodate six-car local trains.

The station was closed from July to November 2003 and was completely rehabilitated.

Station layout

This elevated station, which has two side platforms and three tracks, is built on a curve, which results in large gaps between the center doors of trains and the platform. The gaps were almost wide enough to need gap fillers. By 2008, most of the station's gaps had been filled, but train announcements still warn passengers to "be careful of the gap between the platform and the train."

The station has a white windscreen and black fencing. The ends of the platform are very narrow.

The 2004 artwork here is called A Trip up the Bronx River by Daniel del Valle. It features stained glass windows on the platform windscreens and station house depicting sites along the Bronx River.

Exits
The station does not have a mezzanine, therefore in-system transfers between the two directions are not possible. The station houses are at the same level as the platforms. The two southbound exits lead to the northwestern corner of the skewed intersection of 174th Street and Southern Boulevard. The two northbound exits are on either eastern corner of that intersection.

References

External links 

 
 nycsubway.org — A Trip Up The Bronx River Artwork by Daniel Del Valle (2004)
 Station Reporter — 2 Train
 Station Reporter — 5 Train
 The Subway Nut — 174th Street Pictures 
 MTA's Arts For Transit — 174th Street (IRT White Plains Road Line)
 174th Street entrance from Google Maps Street View
 Platforms from Google Maps Street View

IRT White Plains Road Line stations
New York City Subway stations in the Bronx
Railway stations in the United States opened in 1904
1904 establishments in New York City